Samson Nwabueze (born 20 April 1988) is a Nigerian professional footballer who plays as a defender for Viitorul Dăești.

At the professional level, he has played only in Romania, mainly with Liga II teams, namely Știința Bacău, Tricolorul Breaza, Callatis Mangalia, Damila Măciuca and Râmnicu Vâlcea. After almost 10 years in the country, Nwabueze finally made his Liga I debut with Pandurii Târgu Jiu on 13 February 2017, in a match against Viitorul Constanța.

References

External links
 
 

1988 births
Living people
Sportspeople from Lagos
Nigerian footballers
Nigerian expatriate footballers
Association football defenders
Liga I players
CS Pandurii Târgu Jiu players
Liga II players
FC Politehnica Iași (2010) players
CS Sportul Snagov players
SCM Râmnicu Vâlcea players
LPS HD Clinceni players
AFC Turris-Oltul Turnu Măgurele players
Nigerian expatriate sportspeople in Romania
Expatriate footballers in Romania